Eid Mubarak is an Arabic term that means “Blessed feast/festival'”. The term is used by Muslims all over the world. Internationally Muslims use it as a greeting on the feast. In the social sense, people usually celebrate Eid al-Fitr after Ramadan and Eid al-Adha in the month of Dhul Hijjah (the 12th and final Islamic month). Some state that this exchange of greetings is a cultural tradition and not part of any religious obligation.

Regional variations
Throughout the Muslim world there are numerous other greetings for Eid ul-Adha and Eid ul-Fitr. The companions of Muhammad used to say to each other in Arabic when they met on Eid ul-Fitr: Taqabbalallâhu minnâ wa minkum (which means "[May] God accept from us and you [our fasts and deeds]"). Throughout the Muslim world, variations in Eid greetings exist.

Arab world
Arab Muslims use the term Eid Mubarak, and have a number of other ways to say happy holiday. Some Arabs also add "kul 'am wantum bikhair" (كل عام و أنتم بخير), which means "May you be well with every passing year". There is another common term in GCC states which is "Minal Aidin wal Faizin" (من العايدين والفايزين), an Arab sentence meaning "May we be sacred [one more time] and may we be succeed [in our fasting]", and the reply will be “Minal Maqbulin wal Ghanmin” (من المقبولين والغانمين), which means “May [our good deeds] be accepted [by God] and may we win [the paradise]”.

Iran, Afghanistan, Tajikistan 
Persian speakers (Iranians, Afghans and Tajiks) use the phrase “eid-e shoma mobarak” (عید شما مبارک) or “eid mobarak” (عید مبارک) for short.

Bosnia & Herzegovina
Bosnian Muslims also commonly say "Bajram Šerif mubarek olsun"; the response is "Allah razi olsun". Another common Eid greeting by Bosnian Muslims is "Bajram barećula".

Serbia

In Serbia, Muslims usually celebrate by saying "Bajram Šerif Mubarek Olsun" to which the other replies with "Allah Razi Olsun"

Turkey and Azerbaijan 
In Turkey and Azerbaijan, Turks wish each other happy Eid with Turkish phrases including: "Bayramınız kutlu olsun" ("May your Eid be blessed"), "İyi Bayramlar" ("Good Eid days"), and "Bayramımız mübarek olsun" ("May our Eid be blessed"). The phrase “ Eid Mubarak” is not used.

South Asia
In India, Pakistan and Bangladesh, people say Eid Mubarak wishes by shaking hands and hugging them three times followed by hand shake one more time after the Salat al Eid.

Pakistan

Urdu speakers, traditionally, only start saying the greeting after the Eid prayer. However, newer generations typically resort to saying the greeting at midnight of the Eid day, similar to other special days such as New Year's Day or birthdays. They use the greeting "Eid Mubarak" which is traditionally replied with "Khair Mubarak". "Āp ko bhi Eid Mubarak" is a rising alternative response among the newer urban generations.

Pashto speakers (mainly Pashtun people from Khyber Pakhtunkhwa province and eastern Afghanistan) also use the Eid greeting "May your festival be blessed" (akhtar de mubarak sha).

Balochi speakers (mainly Baloch people from Balochistan province and Iran's Sistan and Baluchestan Province) also use the Eid greeting "May your Eid be blessed" (aied tara mubarak ba).

Brahui speakers may also use the Eid greeting "Have a blessed Eid" (aied ne mubarak mare).

Bangladesh

Many Bangladeshis may also use the phrase "Eid Mubarak" or "Eid greeting, "Eid's Greetings" (ঈদের শুভেচ্ছা; Eider Shubhechchha).

Southeast Asia

Muslims in countries such as Indonesia and the Malay language-speaking populations of Malaysia, Brunei, and Singapore use the expression "Selamat Hari Raya" or "Selamat Idul Fitri" (Indonesian) or "Salam Aidilfitri" (Malay). This expression is usually accompanied by the popular expression "Minal Aidin wal Faizin," an Arab sentence meaning "May we be sacred one more time and succeed in our fasting". It is a quotation from a poem written by Shafiyuddin Al-Huli during the time Muslims ruled in Al-Andalus.

Philippines
In the Philippines, it is recognized as a legal holiday, though the Arabic greeting of Eid Mubarak has gained traction only recently. The traditional greeting of Muslims in the Philippines resembles that of the neighboring Malay-speaking world. This is namely "Salamat Hariraya Puwasa" (Selamat Hari Raya Puasa) for Eid al-Fitr, and "Salamat Hariraya Hadji" (Selamat Hari Raya Hajji) for Eid al-Adha.

West Africa
The Hausa language, originally from Northern Nigeria and Niger, is widely spoken among Muslims throughout West Africa. Their equivalent Eid greetings in Hausa is "Barka da Sallah," which translates to "blessed Eid prayers."

In Mali, the greeting in Bambara on Eid al-Adha is "Sambe-Sambe." This greeting is similarly used by countries that have majority Mande speaking peoples, another Lingua Franca spoken by Muslims in West Africa, or were once part of the historic Mali Empire.

Ghana
"Ni ti yuun' palli" is the Eid greeting among Dagbanli and Kusaase speakers in Ghana. It means "Happy new Eid season". The Hausa greeting "Barka da Sallah" is also commonly used during the period.

Latin America and Spain 
Muslims in countries in Latin America use the expression "Feliz Eid" (Spanish).

Albania

Muslims in Albania and Kosovo use the term (Urime e festa fitr/ kurban bajramit).

See also 
Jumu'ah Mubarak
Eid stamp

Notes

References

Arabic words and phrases
Greeting words and phrases
Eid (Islam)
Islamic terminology
Ramadan